The Assistant Chief of the Naval Staff (Home) was a senior British Royal Navy appointment. The post holder was part of the Admiralty Naval Staff and member of the Board of Admiralty from 1942 to 1945.

History
Established as a new position in 1940 as part of the restructuring of the responsibilities of the Assistant Chief of Naval Staff the post holder was a part of the Admiralty Naval Staff and member of the Board of Admiralty. He was responsible for supervising the directors of a number of naval staff divisions namely the Anti-Submarine and Warfare Division, Local Defence Division, Operations Division (Home), Operations Division (Mining)
and the Training and Staff Duties Division until 1945.

Office Holders
Included:
 Rear-Admiral Arthur J. Power, — (May 1940–May 1942) 
 Rear-Admiral E. J. Patrick Brind, —	(May 1942–August 1944)
 Rear-Admiral E. Desmond B. McCarthy, — (August 1944–October 1945)

References

A